Minuscule 777 (in the Gregory-Aland numbering), ε469 (von Soden), is a Greek minuscule manuscript of the New Testament written on parchment. Palaeographically it has been assigned to the 12th century. The manuscript has complex contents.

Description 
The codex contains the text of the four Gospels, on 185 parchment leaves (size ). The text is written in one column per page, 29 lines per page.

It contains 24 pictures.

It contains miniatures similar to those from minuscule 2427.

Text 
The Greek text of the codex is a representative of the Byzantine text-type. Hermann von Soden classified it to the textual family Kx. Aland placed it in Category V.

According to the Claremont Profile Method it represent the textual family Kx in Luke 1 and Luke 20. In Luke 10 no profile was made.

It lacks texts of Matthew 16:2b–3 and Luke 22:43-44.

History 
C. R. Gregory dated the manuscript to the 12th century. The manuscript is currently dated by the INTF to the 12th century.

The manuscript was noticed in a catalogue from 1876.

It was added to the list of New Testament manuscripts by Gregory (777). Gregory saw the manuscript in 1886.

The manuscript is now housed at the National Library of Greece (93) in Athens.

See also 

 List of New Testament minuscules
 Biblical manuscript
 Textual criticism
 Minuscule 776

References

Further reading 
 

Greek New Testament minuscules
12th-century biblical manuscripts
Manuscripts of the National Library of Greece